Consolevania is a Scottish internet television with a magazine format, dedicated to video game reviews, gaming features, and comedy sketches based on gaming culture. The show's format was adapted for mainstream television as the BBC Scotland show videoGaiden, featuring the same creative team, while episodes of Consolevania continued to be produced and distributed online as time permitted.

History
The show began production in early 2004, and episodes were initially distributed for free on CD in the post to interested members of the RLLMUK discussion forum, before being made available as torrents and then as HTTP downloads from the show's website and mirror sites. The first two episodes of Series One were released in March and April 2004, with the rest of the series being released between August 2004 and April 2005.

The first and second episodes of Series Two appeared in July and August 2005, following which the show was put on hiatus while the creative team worked on the first series of videoGaiden. Episodes 3–7 were released at monthly intervals between March and July 2006. A second hiatus followed, during which the second series of videoGaiden was made and broadcast, and the eighth and final episode of Series Two was finally released in February 2007.

Series Three began in the summer of 2007, and four episodes (as well as a lost episode) were released between June and October 2007. Production of Consolevania then halted again for the third series of videoGaiden (December 2007–March 2008). In late 2008, the show's creators experimented with a new distribution method, making new reviews and sketches available on the show's YouTube account before releasing compilations of these items as episodes in the usual manner. However, this proved to be a short-lived experiment: equipment problems and the creative team's growing disenchantment led to the end of the original run of Consolevania in January 2009.

After an eight-year hiatus, and following the release of a fourth series of videoGaiden in 2016, a new series of Consolevania, based on a subscription model, was announced at the beginning of 2017. New episodes have been made available to the show's Patreon subscribers on a monthly basis, from February 2017 onwards. Series Four concluded in November 2017 and was followed by a Christmas special. Series Five began in January 2018, and Series Six (a shorter series of themed episodes) in January 2019. Following a trailed change to the series format, Series Seven began in August 2019. Series Eight, the longest to date (24 episodes), started just before the COVID-19 pandemic imposed further changes such as the livestreaming of episodes on Twitch. Following an announcement on 19 February 2022 that the creators were relinquishing their rights to the show and its format, the ninth series began in February 2022.

24 episodes (one of which is currently missing) were produced during the show's original 2004–09 run, while 72 episodes have been produced so far for the second run (2017- ), making a current total of 96.

Series overview

Episodes

Series 1 (2004–05)

Series 2 (2005–07)

Series 3 (2007–09)

Series 4 (2017)

Series 5 (2018)

Series 6 (2019)

Series 7 (2019-20)

Series 8 (2020-22)

Series 9 (2022-)

References

Consolevania